Mauricio Alejandro Llovera (born April 17, 1996) is a Venezuelan professional baseball pitcher in the San Francisco Giants organization. Llovera signed with the Philadelphia Phillies as an international free agent in  2015. He made his MLB debut in 2020 for the Phillies and has also played for the Giants.

Career

Philadelphia Phillies
Llovera signed with the Philadelphia Phillies as an international free agent on February 12, 2015. He played for the Venezuelan Summer League Phillies in 2015, going 2–4 with a 3.23 earned run average (ERA) over  innings. Llovera spent the 2016 season with the Gulf Coast League Phillies, going 7–1 with a 1.87 ERA over 53 innings. 

He played the 2017 season with the Lakewood BlueClaws, going 2–4 with a 3.35 ERA over 86 innings. Llovera spent the 2018 season with the Clearwater Threshers, going 8–7 with a 3.72 ERA over 121 innings, with 137 strikeouts. 

He spent the 2019 season with the Reading Fightin Phils, going 3–4 with a 4.55 ERA over  innings. 

Llovera was added to the Phillies 40–man roster following the 2019 season. He was promoted to the major leagues for the first time on September 6, 2020, and made his debut that day against the New York Mets.

On August 7, 2021, pitching against the Mets with the Phillies leading 5–0, Llovera became only the second pitcher in baseball history, the other being B.J. Rosenberg, to give up three straight home runs without recording a single out. However, the Phillies won the game 5–3. In 6 games for the Phillies in 2021, Llovera struggled to a 9.45 ERA with 7 strikeouts. On August 20, Llovera was designated for assignment by the Phillies. On August 22, Llovera cleared waivers and was assigned outright to the Triple-A Lehigh Valley IronPigs.

San Francisco Giants
On December 6, 2021, Llovera signed a minor league deal with the San Francisco Giants. He was assigned to the Triple-A Sacramento River Cats to begin the 2022 season.

On April 29, 2022, Llovera was selected to the active roster after multiple relievers were placed on the COVID-19 injured list. After allowing one run in four innings of work, Llovera was returned to Sacramento on May 6. On May 16, Llovera was selected back to the Giants’ roster. Llovera suffered a Grade 2 right flexor strain in July and missed the remainder of the season after he was placed on the 60-day injured list on July 21. With Sacramento, Llovera made 15 scoreless relief appearances, striking out 28 in 20.0 innings pitched while notching two wins and one save. With the Giants he was 0-0 with a 4.41 ERA, collecting 20 strikeouts in 16.1 innings pitched. 

On November 18, 2022, Llovera was non-tendered by San Francisco and became a free agent. On November 19, Llovera re-signed with the Giants organization on a minor league contract.

References

External links

Mauricio Llovera at Pura Pelota (Venezuelan Professional Baseball League)

 
1996 births
Living people
Major League Baseball players from Venezuela
Venezuelan expatriate baseball players in the United States
Major League Baseball pitchers
Philadelphia Phillies players
San Francisco Giants players
Florida Complex League Phillies players
Lakewood BlueClaws players
Caribes de Anzoátegui players
Clearwater Threshers players
Reading Fightin Phils players
Venezuelan Summer League Phillies players
Lehigh Valley IronPigs players
Sacramento River Cats players
People from El Tigre